Gilbert Ballet (March 29, 1853 – March 17, 1916) was a French psychiatrist, neurologist and historian who was a native of Ambazac in the department of Haute-Vienne. 

He studied medicine in Limoges and Paris, and subsequently became Chef de clinique under Jean-Martin Charcot (1825–1893) at the Salpêtrière. In 1900 he became a professor of psychiatry, and in 1904 established the department of psychiatry at Hôtel-Dieu de Paris. In 1909 he succeeded Alix Joffroy as chair of clinical psychiatry and brain disorders at the Hôpital Sainte-Anne. 

In 1909 Ballet was elected president of the Société française d'histoire de la médecine, and in 1912 became a member of the Académie des sciences.

Ballet is remembered for his 1903 publication of Traité de pathologie mentale, which remained a principal reference book on psychiatry for nearly fifty years in France. In 1911 Ballet described a disorder he called psychose hallucinatoire chronique, being defined as chronic delirium that consists primarily of hallucinations. In French psychiatry, "chronic hallucinatory psychosis" was to become classified as a distinct entity, separate from other self-delusional disorders.

Among his other works were an 1897 treatise on hypochondria and paranoia titled Psychoses et affections nerveuses, and an historical biography on philosopher Emanuel Swedenborg ("Swedenborg; histoire d'un visionnaire aux XVIIIe siècle"). With Adrien Proust, he published L'Hygiène du neurasthénique, a book that was later translated into English and published as "The Treatment of Neurasthenia".

Associated eponym 
 "Ballet's sign": Palsy affecting one or more extraocular muscles, commonly associated with Graves' ophthalmopathy.

See also 
 A Clinical Lesson at the Salpêtrière

References 
 Parts of this article are based on a translation of an equivalent article at the French Wikipedia.
 Gilbert Ballet @ Who Named It

French psychiatrists
French neurologists
1853 births
1916 deaths
People from Haute-Vienne
Members of the French Academy of Sciences